John Becker Airport  (Indonesian: Bandar Udara John Becker) is an airport serving the town of Wonreli in Kisar, Southwest Maluku, Maluku, Indonesia. This airport has a single runway with a size of 950 meter x 23 meter which can accommodate DHC-6 Twin Otter aircraft. In addition, the apron is 108 x 46 meters, the taxiway is 75 x 14 meters and the terminal building is 240 square meters.

Currently, the airport serves flights to Ambon and Moa/Tiakur, as well as an interprovincial flight to Kupang in East Nusa Tenggara, operated by Susi Air.

Airlines and destinations

References

External links 
 (Indonesian) Data Bandara John Becker (Kisar), Dirjen Perhubungan Udara 

John Becker Airport